Spruance is a surname. Notable people with the surname include:

 Raymond A. Spruance, U.S. Navy Admiral during World War II
 Trey Spruance, American composer, producer, and musician
 Presley Spruance, American merchant and politician
 Benton Murdoch Spruance, American painter, printmaker, architect